The  is a  scenic railway line in Japan operated by East Japan Railway Company (JR East). It connects Aizu-Wakamatsu Station at Aizuwakamatsu in Fukushima Prefecture with Koide Station at Uonuma in Niigata Prefecture.

The line opened in discontinuous stages between 1928 and 1971. During this time, a replacement bus operated between Aizu-Kawaguchi and Tadami. Full service on the line resumed on 1 October 2022.

Services

All trains are local (all-stations) services, with approximately eight to nine trains in each direction per day. Only three round-trips operate over the entire line, and some seasonal trains operate through onto the line from the Ban'etsu West and Jōetsu lines. Due to the many curves on the line trains take over four hours to traverse its 135.2 km (84.0 mi) length.

Station list 
 All trains stop at every station.
 Trains can pass each other at stations marked "◇", "∨", "∧"; they cannot pass at those marked "｜".

History

Openings
At that time, the Tagokura Dam was under construction and a light railway was built to link Aizu-Kawaguchi with the construction site in order to transport construction material.

In 1971, the two sections were connected with the opening of the passenger only line between Oshirakawa and Tadami.

Closures
Freight services ceased between 1980 and 1982. 

Eventually, JR East reached an agreement with Fukushima Prefecture under which the prefecture would buy the rail infrastructure and land while hiring out its operation to JR East. After 11 years with a replacement bus service, the closed section resumed operations on 1 October 2022.

Both of these closures were due to very low usage.

Rolling stock
 KiHa E120 - Since March 2020
 KiHa 110 series - Since July 2020

Former
 KiHa 40 series - Until July 2020
 KiHa 58 series

Gallery

References

External links

Travel
 Pamphlet "Travel by Tadami Line" (Tadami River Power Source Region Promotion Association)
 Video "Travel around Oku Aizu" (YouTube)
 JR Tadami Line (Tadami Town Tourism Institute Planning Society)
 Oku-Aizu Bu-Ra-Ri Journey (Aizu Bus)

Timetable
 Timetable of Tadami Line, as of April 2020 (Tadami Line Portal Website) 
 Timetable of bus-operated section (Aizu-Kawaguchi - Tadami) (Kaneyama Town Government) 

Station list
 Stations of the Tadami Line (JR East) 

 
Lines of East Japan Railway Company
Rail transport in Fukushima Prefecture
Rail transport in Niigata Prefecture
1067 mm gauge railways in Japan
Railway lines opened in 1928